Viera Podhányiová, married Jakabová (born 19 September 1960 in Zlaté Moravce) is a Slovak former field hockey player who competed in the 1980 Summer Olympics.

References

External links
 

1960 births
Living people
Slovak female field hockey players
Olympic field hockey players of Czechoslovakia
Field hockey players at the 1980 Summer Olympics
Olympic silver medalists for Czechoslovakia
Olympic medalists in field hockey
People from Zlaté Moravce
Sportspeople from the Nitra Region
Medalists at the 1980 Summer Olympics